Glires (Latin glīrēs 'dormice') is a clade (sometimes ranked as a grandorder) consisting of rodents and lagomorphs (rabbits, hares, and pikas). The hypothesis that these form a monophyletic group has been long debated based on morphological evidence. Two morphological studies, published in 2001 and 2003, strongly support the monophyly of Glires. In particular, the 2003 study reported the discovery of fossil material of basal members of Glires, particularly the genera Mimotona, Gomphos, Heomys, Matutinia, Rhombomylus, and Sinomylus. Their description, in 2005, helped to bridge the gap between more typical rodents and lagomorphs. Data published in 2001, based on nuclear DNA, supported Glires as a sister of Euarchonta to form Euarchontoglires, but some genetic data from both nuclear and mitochondrial DNA have been less supportive. A study, published in 2007, investigating retrotransposon presence/absence data unambiguously supports the Glires hypothesis. Studies published in 2011 and 2015 place Scandentia as a sister clade of the Glires, invalidating Euarchonta as a clade.

Citations

General and cited sources 

 
 
 
 
 
 
 

 
Euarchontoglires
Extant Paleocene first appearances
Mammal taxonomy